According to the Encyclopedia of Oklahoma History and Culture, there were two trails that may have been known as  the California Road at the time of the California Gold Rush. A southerly route, which ran through present-day Oklahoma (then known only as Indian Territory), along the Canadian River. A northern route was usually called the California Trail.

The California Road followed the route laid out by Captain Randolph B. Marcy escorting gold seekers during the spring of 1849. Starting from Ft. Smith, Arkansas, it crossed over into Indian Territory and generally followed the Canadian River to the Texas Panhandle. The trail continued across the Panhandle along the Canadian into New Mexico where it met an existing trail south out of Santa Fe to El Paso and west into California. The peak number of emigrants from the eastern United States to California was about twenty thousand on this route in 1849.

The crossing of the east-west California Road with the north-south Texas Road formed a natural point of settlement in Tobucksy County of the Choctaw Nation, a site originally called Bucklucksy. James Jackson McAlester, an employee of licensed traders Reynolds and Hannaford convinced the firm to locate a general store at that location in late 1869. This settlement eventually became McAlester, Oklahoma.

Prominent landmarks in western Indian Territory were Rock Mary and the Antelope Hills.

The Prairie Traveler
"Another road leaves Fort Smith and runs up the south side of the Canadian River to Santa Fé and Albuquerque in New Mexico.

This route is set down upon most of the maps of the present day as having been discovered and explored by various persons, but my own name seems to have been carefully excluded from the list. Whether this omission has been intentional or not, I leave for the authors to determine. I shall merely remark that I had the command and entire direction of an expedition which in 1849 discovered, explored, located, and marked out this identical wagon road from Fort Smith, Arkansas, to Santa Fé, New Mexico, and that this road, for the greater portion of the distance, is the same that has been since recommended for a Pacific railway."

See also
 California Trail

References

Further reading
Dott, Robert H.  "Lieutenant Simpson's California Road Across Oklahoma," The Chronicles of Oklahoma 38 (Summer 1960). 
Foreman, Grant Marcy and the Gold Seekers: The Journal of Captain R. B. Marcy, with an Account of the Gold Rush Over the Southern Route (Norman: University of Oklahoma Press, 1968). 
Hollon, W. Eugene.  Beyond the Cross Timbers: The Travels of Randolph B. Marcy, 1812-1887 (Norman: University of Oklahoma Press, 1955). 
Hunt, Thomas H.  Ghost Trails To California (Palo Alto, Calif.: American West Publishing Company, 1974). 
Potter, David Morris.  Trail to California: The Overland Journal of Vincent Geiger and Wakeman Bryarly (New Haven: Yale University Press, 1945). 
Wright, Muriel H.  "Historical Places on the Old Stage Line from Fort Smith to Red River," The Chronicles of Oklahoma 11 (June 1933).

External links
 Texas Historical Marker near Amarillo
 Texas Historical Marker near Adrian
 Texas Historical Marker near Borger
 Early Trails Through Oklahoma, Captain Marcy's starts on page 106
 Encyclopedia of Oklahoma History and Culture - California Road
 Oklahoma Digital Maps: Digital Collections of Oklahoma and Indian Territory

Trails and roads in the American Old West
Historic trails and roads in Missouri
Historic trails and roads in Kansas
Historic trails and roads in Oklahoma